is a Shinto shrine in the city of Takayama, Gifu Prefecture, Japan. It is dedicated to the first Shōgun of the Tokugawa Shogunate, Tokugawa Ieyasu.

The Takayama Tōshō-gū was built in 1619 by Kanamori Shigeyori, the daimyō of Takayama Domain. In 1818, a sub-shrine, the Kinryu Jinja (金龍神社) was added to its precincts to honor the spirits of the Kanamori clan. The shrine's annual festival is April 15.

See also 
Tōshō-gū
List of Tōshō-gū

1619 establishments in Japan
Shinto shrines in Gifu Prefecture
Takayama, Gifu
Hida Province
Tōshō-gū